In mathematics, the tensor-hom adjunction is that the tensor product  and hom-functor  form an adjoint pair:

This is made more precise below.  The order of terms in the phrase "tensor-hom adjunction" reflects their relationship: tensor is the left adjoint, while hom is the right adjoint.

General statement
Say R and S are (possibly noncommutative) rings, and consider the right module categories (an analogous statement holds for left modules):

Fix an (R,S)-bimodule X and define functors F: D → C and G: C → D as follows:

Then F is left adjoint to G.  This means there is a natural isomorphism

This is actually an isomorphism of abelian groups.  More precisely, if Y is an (A, R) bimodule and Z is a (B, S) bimodule, then this is an isomorphism of (B, A) bimodules.  This is one of the motivating examples of the structure in a closed bicategory.

Counit and unit

Like all adjunctions, the tensor-hom adjunction can be described by its counit and unit natural transformations.  Using the notation from the previous section, the counit

has components

given by evaluation:  For 

The components of the unit

is a right -module homomorphism given by 

The counit and unit equations can now be explicitly verified.

Likewise, 

is a right -module homomorphism defined by

and therefore

The Ext and Tor functors
The Hom functor  commutes with arbitrary limits, while the tensor product  functor commutes with arbitrary colimits that exist in their domain category. However, in general,  fails to commute with colimits, and  fails to commute with limits; this failure occurs even among finite limits or colimits. This failure to preserve short exact sequences motivates the definition of the Ext functor and the Tor functor.

See also 
 Currying
 Ext functor
 Tor functor
 Change of rings

References

 

Adjoint functors
Commutative algebra